Ervin is a given name. Notable people with the name include:

Ervin Abel (1929–1984), Estonian actor
Ervin Acél (conductor) (1935–2006), Romanian conductor
Ervin Acel (fencer) (1888–1958), American fencer
Ervin Baktay (1890–1963), author noted for popularizing Indian culture in Hungary
Ervin Baldwin (born 1986), American football defensive end
Ervin Bauer (1890–1938), Hungarian biologist
Ervin Bossányi (1891–1975), Hungarian artist, worked mainly in northern Germany until his emigration in 1934
Ervin Bulku (born 1981), Albanian football player
Ervin Burrell, fictional character on the HBO drama The Wire, played by actor Frankie Faison
Ervin Cseh (1838–1918), Hungarian politician from Slavonia, served as Minister without portfolio of Croatian Affairs
Ervin Drake (1919–2015), American songwriter whose works include such American Songbook standards as "It Was a Very Good Year"
Ervin Eleskovic (born 1987), professional tennis player from Sweden
Ervin Fakaj (born 1976), former Albanian footballer
Ervin Y. Galantay, Professor Emeritus (architecture and planning) of the Swiss Federal Technical University of Lausanne
Ervin Gashi (born 1990), Swiss footballer of Albanian descent
Ervin González (born 1985), Colombian football forward
Ervin Hall (born 1947), American athlete who competed mainly in the 110 metre hurdles
Ervin Hatibi, Albanian poet, essayist and painter
Ervin Hoffmann, Hungarian sprint canoeist who competed from the late 1980s to the late 1990s
Ervin Hunt, former defensive back in the National Football League
Ervin Johnson (born 1967), American former professional basketball player
Ervin Kassai (1925–2012), Hungarian basketball referee
Ervin Katona, (born 1977), Serbian strongman competitor and regular entrant to the World's Strongest Man competition
Ervin Kovács (born 1967), Hungarian football player
Ervin László (born 1932), Hungarian philosopher of science, systems theorist, integral theorist, originally a classical pianist
Ervin Lázár (1936–2006), Hungarian author
Ervin Llani (born 1983), Albanian footballer
Ervin Mészáros (1877–1940), Hungarian Olympic fencer
Ervin McSweeney (born 1957), New Zealand cricketer
Ervin Memetov (born 1990), Ukrainian footballer
Ervin Nagy, Hungarian pianist and composer
Ervin Nyiregyházi (1903–1987), Hungarian-born American pianist
Ervin Õunapuu (born 1956), Estonian writer, playwright, stage designer and filmmaker
Ervin Pringle (1910–1991), Liberal party member of the Canadian House of Commons
Ervin Randle (born 1962), American football linebacker
Ervin J. Rokke, retired lieutenant general and retired President of Moravian College
Ervin Roszner (1852–1928), Hungarian politician, served as Minister besides the King between 1915 and 1917
Ervin Rustemagić, Bosnian comic producer and distributor, born in Sarajevo, Bosnia and Herzegovina currently based in Slovenia
Ervin Santana (born 1982), Major League Baseball right-handed starting pitcher
Ervin Schiffer, Hungarian born professional violist and pedagogue
Ervin Harold Schulz (1911–1978), American businessman, newspaper editor, and politician
Ervin Skela (born 1976), Albanian footballer
Ervin Somogyi (born 1944), pioneer of steel string guitar making
Ervin Sotto (born 1981), Filipino professional basketball player
Ervin Staub, Professor of Psychology, Emeritus, at the University of Massachusetts Amherst
Ervin Szörenyi, Hungarian sprint canoeist who competed in the mid-1950s
Ervin Szerelemhegyi (1891–1969), Hungarian track and field athlete, competed in the 1912 Summer Olympics
Ervin Zádor  (1934–2012), Hungarian retired water polo player and former member of the Hungarian national team

See also
 Earvin
 Ervin (disambiguation)
 Ervin (surname)
 Erving (disambiguation)
 Erwan
 Ervine
 Erwin (disambiguation)
 Irvin
 Irvine
 Irving
 Irwin (disambiguation)

Albanian masculine given names
Estonian masculine given names
Hungarian masculine given names

no:Ervin